Battle of Sialkot may refer to:

 Battle of Sialkot (1761)
 Battle of Sialkot (1763)